The 1977–78 Kansas City Kings season was their sixth season in Kansas City. The Kings had a losing record for the third consecutive season which resulted in missing the playoffs. The club started the season with 13 wins and 24 losses, which led to the dismissal of coach Phil Johnson. Under his replacement Larry Staverman the Kings would not play any better as they finished in last place with a 31–51 record.

Draft picks

Roster

Regular season

Season standings

Record vs. opponents

Game log

References

Sacramento Kings seasons
Kansas City
Kansas
Kansas